Hiroshi Kobayashi may refer to:

 Hiroshi Kobayashi (boxer) (born 1944), Japanese boxer
 Hiroshi Kobayashi, chemist, synthesised Kobayashi's anion
 Hiroshi Kobayashi (footballer) (born 1959), Japanese football player and manager
 Hiroshi Kobayashi (shogi, born 1962), Japanese shogi player
 Hiroshi Kobayashi (shogi, born 1976), Japanese shogi player
 Hiroshi Kobayashi (baseball) (born 1970), Japanese pitcher